The 2003 MLS Superdraft was held January 17, 2003 in Kansas City, Missouri. It was the fifth annual SuperDraft held by Major League Soccer.

Player selection
Any player whose name is marked with an * was contracted under the Project-40 program.

Round One

Round one trades

Round Two

Round two trades

Round Three

Round three trades

Round Four

Round four trades

Round Five

Round five trades

Round Six

Round six trades

Notable undrafted players

References 

 

Major League Soccer drafts
SuperDraft
MLS SuperDraft
Soccer in Missouri
Sports in Kansas City, Missouri
Events in Kansas City, Missouri
MLS SuperDraft
2000s in Kansas City, Missouri